Michael Springer (born August 4, 1979) is a lacrosse player for the Philadelphia Barrage of Major League Lacrosse. Springer was a four-time All American at Syracuse University. He now coaches varsity lacrosse at Don Bosco Prep.

Major League Lacrosse
Springer was drafted by the Barrage in 2003, and made an immediate impact with the team netting 20 goals as a rookie.  Springer has continued to contribute to the team.  In 2006, he was awarded with Offensive Player of the Week in Week Five of the season.  In addition, Springer has helped the Barrage to win three Steinfeld Cup championships in 2004, 2006, and 2007.

See also
 Syracuse Orange men's lacrosse

References

1979 births
Living people
American lacrosse players
Major League Lacrosse players
Syracuse Orange men's lacrosse players